Brian Andrew Leiser (better known as Fast, born 29 March 1972), is a member of the New York band Fun Lovin' Criminals. He plays bass, keyboards, harmonica and the trumpet, and from 2021, took over duties as lead singer.

Fun Lovin' Criminals have enjoyed particular success in Europe but have also performed globally. The band's music is known worldwide.

Discography 
 Saudade (2019)

References 

1972 births
Living people
American expatriates in the United Kingdom
American rock bass guitarists
American rock keyboardists
American harmonica players
American male trumpeters
People from Chappaqua, New York